Larionov (masculine) or Larionova (feminine) is a common Russian surname shared by the following people:
Anna Larionova (born 1975), retired Russian Olympic alpine skier
Dmitry Larionov (born 1985), Russian slalom canoer
Igor Larionov (born 1960), Russian ice hockey player
Ivan Larionov (1830–1889), Russian composer, writer and folklorist
Mikhail Larionov (1881–1964),  Russian avant-garde painter
Nikolay Larionov (born 1957), Russian association football player
Olga Larionova (born 1935), pen name of Olga Tideman, Soviet/Russian science fiction writer
Tatiana Larionova (born 1955), Russian politician
Vsevolod Larionov (1928–2000), Russian film and television actor
Yekaterina Larionova (born 1994), freestyle wrestler from Kazakhstan
Yuri Larionov (born 1986), Russian pairs figure skater

Russian-language surnames